Hong Seung-hee (born 19 August 1997) is a South Korean actress. She is known for her roles in dramas such as Just Dance, Navillera, and Move to Heaven. She also appeared in movie Pawn as Seung-yi.

Career  
Hong debuted with KBS drama Just Dance in 2018.

In 2019, Hong participated in the third season of Voice, making a special appearance in episodes 1–2. And in one year, Hong participated in the KBS drama I Wanna Hear Your Song and the TV Chosun drama Leverage.

In 2020, Hong made a special appearance in the tvN drama Memoristand joined the TV Chosun drama Kingmaker: The Change of Destiny  and Hong made her film debut Pawn.

In 2021, Hong appeared in the tvN drama Navillera as the granddaughter of Park In-hwan's protagonist character. Later in May, Hong appeared in the Netflix drama Move to Heaven, acted as the childhood friend of Tang Jun-sang's role.

Filmography

Film

Television series

Web series

References

External links
 Hong Seung-hee at C-JeS Entertainment
 
 

1997 births
Living people
21st-century South Korean actresses
People from Hwaseong, Gyeonggi
South Korean female models
South Korean television actresses
South Korean film actresses
University of Suwon alumni